Dramarama is an alternative rock band.

It may also refer to:

 Dramarama (TV series), a 1980s British television series
 Dramarama (film), a 2001 Icelandic anthology film
 Dramarama (film), a 2006 film that was to star Lindsay Lohan but was unreleased
 "Dramarama", a 2017 song by K-pop boy group Monsta X
 Total DramaRama, a Canadian/American animated television series